Princess Margaret Hospital is a public hospital in Christchurch, New Zealand. It is run by the Canterbury District Health Board.

History

The SEGAR block was opened on 31 August 1959 as a general hospital, but is primarily used for older persons health care and mental health services. It also houses much of the administration of Canterbury District Health Board. It is built at the foot of the Port Hills, at the western edge of the suburb of Cashmere.

The hospital was named after Princess Margaret, sister of Queen Elizabeth II.

The land was purchased from the Cracroft Wilson estate and the buildings designed by the Christchurch architectural partnership of Seward and Stanton. Charles Luney was chosen as the construction professional. The complex was opened by the then Governor-General of New Zealand, Charles Lyttelton, 10th Viscount Cobham.

At one point, it was thought that this would become the main hospital for Christchurch. However, it was determined to be too far away from the city centre.

South Island Eating Disorders Service

Princess Margaret Hospital has a regional service that specially caters for people suffering from eating disorders known as the South Island Eating Disorders Service. The unit is the only place in New Zealand which has a in-patient unit specifically offering a dedicated weight gain programme to treat people with eating disorders.

The unit is small and holds six to seven service users and shares facilities with the Mothers and Babies Unit next door (the two are collectively known as C-Ward"). The unit also has an outpatient area designed for people to have therapy suffering from eating disorders.

References

External links

The Princess Margaret Hospital – Canterbury District Health Board

Hospital buildings completed in 1959
Buildings and structures in Christchurch
Hospitals in New Zealand
Hospitals established in 1959
1950s architecture in New Zealand
Brutalist architecture in New Zealand